Burylovo is a rural locality (a village) in Osintsevskoye Rural Settlement, Kishertsky District, Perm Krai, Russia. The population was 7 as of 2010.

Geography 
Burylovo is located 40 km east of Ust-Kishert (the district's administrative centre) by road. Borovchata is the nearest rural locality.

References 

Rural localities in Kishertsky District